Georgia State Route 22 Spur may refer to:

 Georgia State Route 22 Spur (Columbus): a spur route of State Route 22 that exists entirely within Columbus
 Georgia State Route 22 Spur (Salem): a former spur route of State Route 22 that existed partially in Salem

022 Spur